The World Olympic Gymnastics Academy (WOGA) is a two-facility gymnastics club located in Frisco and Plano.

The head coaches at WOGA are former USA Gymnastics women's national team coordinator Valeri Liukin, who was a Soviet medalist at the 1988 Olympic Games, and Yevgeny Marchenko who coached gold medalist Carly Patterson. Some of the notable past elites are Elizabeth "Lizzy" LeDuc, Katelyn Ohashi, Grace McLaughlin, Briley Casanova, Ivana Hong, Rebecca Bross, World Champions Hollie Vise and Alyssa Baumann, as well as Olympic Champions Carly Patterson, Nastia Liukin and Madison Kocian. Edouard Iarov, former coach of Valeri Liukin, the USSR and Canadian national teams also trained gymnasts at the club.

History 
World Olympic Gymnastics Academy (WOGA) opened in 1994 by co-founders Valeri Liukin, a 1988 Olympic Champion and Yevgeny Marchenko, a World Sports Acrobatic Champion.

In 2003, WOGA gymnasts Carly Patterson and Hollie Vise won 2 individual medals and contributed to the first team gold for the US at the World Championships.  In 2004, Carly Patterson became the second American gymnast to become the Women's Olympic All-Around Gymnastics Champion, and the first American to do so in a non-boycotted Olympics.

WOGA is home to three Olympic Champions – Patterson (Athens 2004), Nastia Liukin (Beijing 2008), and Madison Kocian (Rio 2016); and home to six World Champions – Patterson (2003), Hollie Vise (2003), Liukin (2005, 2007), Ivana Hong (2007), Kocian (2014, 2015), and Alyssa Baumann (2014).

WOGA Classic 
WOGA hosts an annual meet at the Comerica Center in Frisco, Texas, which has competitions from levels 1-10 as well as an international elite competition which has seen competitors such as Laurie Hernandez, Katelyn Ohashi, Madeline Gardiner, Marine Brevet, Mira Boumejmajen and Jordyn Wieber.

Notable Gymnasts and Alumni

Women's Artistic Gymnastics
Carly Patterson: 
 2004 Olympic All-Around Champion, Team & Balance Beam Silver Medalist
 2003 World All-Around Silver Medalist, 2003 World Team Gold Medalist
 2004 National All-Around Champion
 2003 and 2004 American Cup Champion

Hollie Vise: 
 2003 World Team and Uneven Bars Champion
 Oklahoma Sooners gymnastics scholarship

Nastia Liukin: 
 2008 Olympic All-Around Champion, Balance Beam, Uneven Bars, and Team Silver Medalist, Floor Exercise Bronze Medalist
 2007 World Balance Beam and Team Champion, Uneven Bars Silver Medalist
 2006 World Uneven Bars and Team Silver Medalist
 2005 World Uneven Bars and Balance Beam Champion, All-Around and Floor Exercise Silver Medalist
 2006 and 2005 US National Gymnastics All-Around Champion, 13x National Championships medalist
 2007 Pan American Games Team Champion and Uneven Bars and Balance Beam Silver Medalist
 2006 and 2008 American Cup Champion

Ivana Hong:
 2008 Olympics U.S. Team Alternate
 2007 World Team Champion
 2009 World Bronze Medalist on Balance Beam
 Stanford University gymnastics scholarship

Rebecca Bross: 
 2009 World All-Around Silver and Uneven Bars Bronze Medalist
 2010 World Team and Balance Beam Silver and All-Around and Uneven Bars Bronze medalist
 2010 US National Gymnastics All-Around Champion; 8x National Championships medalist
 2007 Pan American Games Team and Floor Exercise gold medalist
 2010 American Cup Champion

Briley Casanova:
 competed in the 2009 Visa championships and finished 8th all-around

Grace McLaughlin:
 2011 Pan-American Games Team Gold Medalist
 Florida Gators gymnastics scholarship
 2015 NCAA National Team Champion
 2017 and 2018 NCAA National Team Bronze Medalist

Katelyn Ohashi: 
 2011 US National Gymnastics Junior All-Around Champion
 2013 American Cup gold medalist
 UCLA Bruins gymnastics scholarship
 2018 NCAA National Team and Floor Exercise Champion
 2019 NCAA National Team and Balance Beam Bronze medalist

Madison Kocian:
 2016 Olympic Team Champion and Uneven Bars silver medalist
 2014 Team World Champion
 2015 Team and Uneven Bars World Champion
 2015 Uneven Bars National Champion
 UCLA Bruins gymnastics scholarship
 2018 NCAA National Team Champion
 2019 NCAA National Team Bronze medalist

Alyssa Baumann:
 2014 World Champion (team)
 2014 and 2015 National Balance Beam Silver Medalist
 Florida Gators gymnastics scholarship
 2018 NCAA National Team and Floor Exercise Bronze Medalist

Irina Alexeeva (representing Russia):
 2018 World Team Silver Medalist
 2018 European Team Champion
 Member of the Russian National Team
 2016 U.S. Classic Junior champion
 Stanford University gymnastics scholarship

Skye Blakely:
 2022 World Champion (team)
 2019 Junior World Championships Team bronze medalist
 Florida Gators gymnastics scholarship

Konnor McClain:
 2021 World Championships team member
 2022 National Champion

Madray Johnson:
 2021 Junior Pan American Champion (team, balance beam), silver medalist (all-around, uneven bars)
 2021 Junior Pan American Games Champion (team, uneven bars, balance beam)

Brenda Magaña (representing Mexico):
 2002 World Championships competitor
 2003 Pan American Games floor exercise silver medalist and vault bronze medalist
 1997 Pan American Championships vault silver medalist

Vanessa Atler:
 1999 World Championships competitor
 1998 Goodwill Games Champion (vault and floor exercise)

McKenzie Wofford:
 Oklahoma Sooners gymnastics scholarship

Men's Artistic Gymnastics
Glenn McCuen
 2008 Regional Champion; 2008 Texas State Champion
 Star of Nickelodeon's teen sitcom, Bucket & Skinner's Epic Adventures

Acrobatic Gymnastics
Dylan Inserra:
 2008-2010 All-Around National Champion (acrobatic gymnastics)
 2009 - 2011 Senior National Team Member
 2010 World Finalist - Acrobatic Gymnastics (partner Axel Osborne)

Axl Osborne
 2008-2010 All-Around National Champion (acrobatic gymnastics)
 2009 - 2011 Senior National Team Member 
 2010 World Finalist - Acrobatic Gymnastics (partner Dylan Inserra)

Lawsuit
In 2006 a WOGA coach was sentenced to 15 years in prison after pleading guilty to sexually assaulting a 14 year old gymnast. The gymnast and her family filed a lawsuit against the owners of World Olympic Gymnastics Academy 
alleging that they had failed to properly screen and supervise the coach. The suit does not seek a specific amount of money from the academy owners and doesn't accuse them of abuse.

Bill Boyd, the gym's attorney, has said all instructors receive a criminal background check and the gym was not aware of any accusations until a police investigation in 2005, after Wagoner had left.

 Wagoner was arrested in Jacksonville, Florida and received a 15 year prison sentence after pleading guilty to sexually assaulting the gymnast.

References

External links
 WOGA Home Page
 ]

 
American companies established in 1994
Gymnastics clubs in the United States
Gymnastics venues in the Dallas–Fort Worth metroplex
1994 establishments in Texas
Sports clubs established in 1994
Sports in Frisco, Texas
Companies based in Frisco, Texas